Josephine Giard (born 22 March 1996) is a German footballer who plays as a forward for Scottish Women's Premier League club Hamilton Academical. She previously played for FSV Gütersloh in Germany and in Scotland with Celtic.

Club career

FSV Gütersloh
From 2013 to 2017, Giard played for FSV Gütersloh in the 2. Frauen-Bundesliga. On 1 September 2013, she made her senior debut for the club and scored the team's fourth goal in a 4–0 win over Halle in the first round of the DFB-Pokal. On 8 September 2013, she made her league debut in a 1–0 loss to VfL Wolfsburg II. Giard made a total of 98 appearances during her 5 years at Gütersloh, scoring 39 goals.

Celtic
On 23 February 2018, Giard left Gütersloh to join Scottish Women's Premier League (SWPL) club Celtic. On 25 February 2018, she made her debut in a 4–0 home victory against St Johnstone in the first round of the SWPL Cup. On 11 March 2018, she made her league debut in a 2–0 win over Forfar Farmington. On 25 March 2018, she scored twice in a 3–0 away victory against Hamilton Academical in the second round of the SWPL Cup. Her first goal for Celtic was also the team's 1,000th goal in all competitions since it was established in 2007.

Hamilton Academical
Giard signed for Hamilton Academical in the second tier of the SWPL in November 2020, after leaving Celtic earlier that month.

Career statistics

Club
.

References

External links
 Josephine Giard at DFB Datencenter
 
 

1996 births
Living people
Celtic F.C. Women players
German women's footballers
German expatriate women's footballers
Women's association football forwards
2. Frauen-Bundesliga players
Scottish Women's Premier League players
Expatriate women's footballers in Scotland
German expatriate sportspeople in Scotland
FSV Gütersloh 2009 players
Hamilton Academical W.F.C. players